In phonetics, denasalization is the loss of nasal airflow in a nasal sound, such as a nasal consonant or a nasal vowel. That may be due to speech pathology but also occurs when the sinuses are blocked from a common cold, when it is called a nasal voice, which is not a linguistic term. Acoustically, it is the "absence of the expected nasal resonance."

When one speaks with a cold, the nasal passages still function as a resonant cavity so a denasalized nasal  does not sound like a voiced oral stop , and a denasalized vowel  does not sound like an oral vowel .

However, there are cases of historical or allophonic denasalization that have produced oral stops. In some languages with nasal vowels, such as Paicĩ, nasal consonants may occur only before nasal vowels; before oral vowels, prenasalized stops are found. That allophonic variation is likely to be from a historical process of partial denasalization.

Similarly, several languages around Puget Sound underwent a process of denasalization about 100 years ago. Except in special speech registers, such as baby talk, the nasals  became the voiced stops . It appears from historical records that there was an intermediate stage in which the stops were prenasalized stops  or poststopped nasals .

See also
Nasalization
Hypernasal speech

References 

Phonetics
Nasalization